Marek Piotrowicz (born 20 November 1963) is a Polish football defender and later manager.

References

1963 births
Living people
Górnik Zabrze
Polish footballers
Ekstraklasa players
Stal Stalowa Wola players
Górnik Zabrze players
GKS Tychy players
Association football defenders
Polish football managers
Górnik Zabrze managers
People from Wadowice County